The 2021 BrakeBest Brake Pads 159 presented by O'Reilly was the 2nd stock car race of the 2021 NASCAR Camping World Truck Series season and the 2nd iteration of the event. The race was held on Friday, February 19, 2021, in Daytona Beach, Florida at the Daytona International Speedway road course. The race was extended from 44 to 51 laps due to a NASCAR overtime finish. As the race ended under caution, Ben Rhodes of ThorSport Racing would win his 2nd straight win of the season and the fifth of his career. To fill out the podium, Sheldon Creed of GMS Racing and John Hunter Nemechek of Kyle Busch Motorsports would finish 2nd and 3rd, respectively.

The race would mark the NASCAR Camping World Truck Series debuts for Lawless Alan and Jett Noland.

Background 

The Daytona infield road course, which includes parts of the 2.5 mi (4.0 km) speedway oval, is most notably used for the 24 Hours of Daytona sports car race and Daytona 200 motorcycle race. In March 2020, NASCAR announced the NASCAR Cup Series' Busch Clash exhibition race would use the road course rather than the oval starting in 2021.

While the event was intended to be just a temporary race for 2020, it returned in 2021 after the Cup and Xfinity Series races at Auto Club Speedway were canceled due to concerns related to COVID-19. Although the Trucks did not have an Auto Club race, their round at Homestead–Miami Speedway was replaced for logistics reasons as Homestead weekend was moved back one week in order to keep the teams in Daytona a second consecutive week. The race became one of four Truck road course events, the most in series history.

*Withdrew due to unknown reasons.

Starting lineup 
Qualifying was determined by a qualifying metric system based on the last race, the 2021 NextEra Energy 250 and owner's points. As a result, Ben Rhodes of ThorSport Racing would win the pole.

Race

Pre-race ceremonies

Race recap

Post-race driver comments

Race results 
Stage 1 Laps: 12

Stage 2 Laps: 13

Stage 3 Laps: 26

References 

2021 NASCAR Camping World Truck Series
NASCAR races at Daytona International Speedway
BrakeBest Brake Pads 159
BrakeBest Brake Pads 159